Robert FitzHugh (died 1436) was Bishop of London and Chancellor of the University of Cambridge.

Origins
FitzHugh was the second son of Henry FitzHugh, 3rd Baron FitzHugh  (-1425), KG, of Ravensworth Castle in North Yorkshire, by his wife Elizabeth Grey (born c. 1363), a daughter of Sir Robert de Grey, a son of John de Grey, 1st Baron Grey de Rotherfield.

Career
FitzHugh was provided to the see of London on 30 April 1431 and was consecrated on 16 September 1431.

Death
FitzHugh died on 15 January 1436.

Memorial
There was a memorial brass to him in the quire at Old St Paul's Cathedral.

Citations

References
 

Bishops of London
Anglo-Normans
Archdeacons of Northampton
1436 deaths
People from Ravensworth
Alumni of King's Hall, Cambridge
Year of birth unknown